K.R.I.T. Iz Here is the fourth studio album by American rapper Big K.R.I.T., released on July 12, 2019, by BMG Rights Management and Multi Alumni. It follows the release of his 2017 album 4eva Is a Mighty Long Time, and is a sequel to his 2010 mixtape K.R.I.T. Wuz Here. It featured guest appearances from Lil Wayne, Saweetie, Rico Love, Yella Beezy, J. Cole and Baby Rose, among others.

Background
Big K.R.I.T. announced the release of the album alongside a single on June 7, 2019. A single, "K.R.I.T. Here", was released the same day. The second single, "Addiction" featuring Lil Wayne and Saweetie, was released on June 24.

Critical reception 

K.R.I.T. Iz Here was met with generally positive reviews. At Metacritic, which assigns a normalized rating out of 100 to reviews from professional publications, the album received an average score of 69, based on four reviews. 

Evan Rytlewski of Pitchfork described Big K.R.I.T. as "almost incapable of making a song that's anything less than perfectly fine", continuing: "K.R.I.T. Iz Here might have been better off if K.R.I.T. had availed himself of a few swings and misses". Writing on HipHopDX, Daniel Spielberger labelled the album as "neither a career-defining album nor a complete flop", also commenting "K.R.I.T. is on auto-pilot".

Track listing
Credits adapted from Tidal.

Charts

References

Big K.R.I.T. albums
2019 albums
Albums produced by Big K.R.I.T.